Joseph F. Johnson (November 3, 1929 – November 1, 2003) was a professional American football player who played running back for seven seasons for the Green Bay Packers and Boston Patriots.

References

1929 births
2003 deaths
Players of American football from New Haven, Connecticut
American football running backs
Boston College Eagles football players
Green Bay Packers players
Boston Patriots players